The 1946 Turin Grand Prix was a Grand Prix motor race held at Valentino Park on 1 September 1946. It is claimed to be the first ever Formula One race, as the race regulations anticipated the official introduction of the new formula on 1 January 1947.

Classification

Final

Turin Grand Prix
Turin Grand Prix
Grand Prix race reports